= De Letzeburger Bauer =

Newspaper in Luxembourg

- Language: Luxembourgish

De Letzeburger Bauer (Luxembourgish pronunciation: [də ˈlətsəbu̯əjɐ ˈbɑʊ̯ɐ], lit. 'The Luxembourgish Farmer') is a weekly agricultural newspaper published in Luxembourg.
